Mark Kehoe (born 9 September 1998) is an Irish hurler who plays for club side Kilsheelan–Kilcash and at inter-county level with the Tipperary senior hurling team. He is usually deployed as a full-forward, but can also be deployed as a corner-forward.

Career statistics

Honours

University College Cork
Fitzgibbon Cup (2): 2019, 2020	

Tipperary
All-Ireland Senior Hurling Championship (1): 2019
All-Ireland Under-21 Hurling Championship (1): 2018
All-Ireland Minor Hurling Championship (1): 2016
Munster Minor Hurling Championship (1): 2016

References 

1998 births
Living people
Kilsheelan-Kilcash hurlers
UCC hurlers
Tipperary inter-county hurlers
Tipperary inter-county Gaelic footballers